Entente Fada N'Gourma was a political party in the Fada N'gourma area of Burkina Faso.

History
The party received 10.1% of the vote in the 1957 Territorial Assembly elections, winning five seats.

References

Defunct political parties in Burkina Faso